Kristina Shea is a mechanical engineer whose research topics include generative design, tensegrity structures, aquatic soft robotics, and 4D printing. She is a professor in the Department of Mechanical and Process Engineering at ETH Zurich, where she holds the chair in Engineering Design and Computing.

Education and career
Shea studied mechanical engineering at Carnegie Mellon University, earning a bachelor's degree in 1993, master's in 1995, and PhD in 1997. Her doctoral dissertation, Essays of Discrete Structures: Purposeful Design of Grammatical Structures by Directed Stochastic Search, was supervised by Jonathan Cagan.

She came to Switzerland as a postdoctoral researcher at the École Polytechnique Fédérale de Lausanne, in the Applied Computing and Mechanics Laboratory of the Department of Civil Engineering. She became a lecturer in engineering design at the University of Cambridge, and then from 2005 to 2012 she was a professor of virtual product development at the Technical University of Munich, before taking her present position at ETH Zurich.

Recognition
Shea won the 2001 Philip Leverhulme Prize in Engineering. She is a Fellow of the ASME, elected in 2013.

References

External links

Year of birth missing (living people)
Living people
Mechanical engineers
Women engineers
Carnegie Mellon University alumni
Academic staff of ETH Zurich
Academics of the University of Cambridge
Fellows of the American Society of Mechanical Engineers